Nowgong Law College commonly known as NLC is a government law school situated at LNB Road, Haibargaon, Nagaon, Naogaon District in the Indian state of Assam. It offers undergraduate 3 years law courses and 5 Year Integrated B.A. LL.B. course affiliated to Gauhati University. This College is recognised by Bar Council of India, New Delhi.

Nowgong Law College offers a 3-year LL.B. (Bachelor of Laws) program, which is the most popular course offered by the college. The college also offers a 5-year integrated B.A.LL.B program. Both programs are approved by the Bar Council of India.

History
Nowgong Law College was established in 1970. This is one of the oldest law college in Assam and the only law college in middle Assam.

References

Law schools in Assam
Educational institutions established in 1970
1970 establishments in Assam
Colleges affiliated to Gauhati University
Law schools
Nagaon